The 2021 Big West Conference men's soccer tournament was the postseason men's soccer tournament for the Big West Conference held on November 3 through 12, 2021. All rounds of the tournament were hosted at the higher seeds home stadium. The six-team single-elimination tournament consisted of three rounds based on seeding from regular season conference play. The defending champions were the UC Davis Aggies.  The Aggies won the tournament in 2019 and are classified as the defending champions because there was no tournament held in 2020 due to the COVID-19 pandemic. UC Davis was unable to defend its crown, falling to UC Santa Barbara in the Semifinals.  UC Santa Barbara would go on to win the title, defeating UC Irvine 4–0 in the final.  This was the second Big West tournament title for the UC Santa Barbara program, both of which have come under head coach Tim Vom Steeg. As tournament champions, UC Santa Barbara earned the Big West's automatic berth into the 2021 NCAA Division I men's soccer tournament.

Seeding 
The top six teams in the regular season earned a spot in the tournament. Teams were seeded based on regular season conference record and tiebreakers were used to determine seedings of teams that finished with the same record.  The first and second seeds earned a bye into the Semifinals, and hosted their Semifinal game. A tiebreaker was required to determine the first and second seeds after UC Santa Barbara and UC Irvine finished the regular season with identical 6–1–2 records.  Their regular season match ended in a tie and the teams had identical goal differential, and therefore goals scored in conference play was used as the tiebreaker.  UC Santa Barbara won the tiebreaker and was awarded the first seed and UC Irvine was the second seed.  UC Riverside and Sacramento State tied for sixth in the regular season standings with identical 3–4–2 records.  UC Riverside earned the sixth and final seed by beating Sacramento State 2–0 in the team's regular season matchup.

Bracket

Source:

Schedule

First Round

Semifinals

Final

Statistics

Goalscorers

References 

Big West Conference Men's Soccer Tournament
2021 Big West Conference men's soccer season